Arthur Robson (29 March 1878 – 24 May 1959) was an Australian rules footballer who played for the Collingwood Football Club in the Victorian Football League (VFL).

Notes

External links 

Collingwood Football Club players
Australian rules footballers from Melbourne
1878 births
1959 deaths
People from Richmond, Victoria